Wynnewood is a city in Garvin County, Oklahoma, United States. The population was 2,212 at the 2010 U.S. census, compared to 2,367 in 2000. Located in what was then the Chickasaw Nation of Indian Territory, it began as a village called "Walner" in 1886, on the proposed route of the Gulf, Colorado and Santa Fe Railway. Railroad workers from Pennsylvania named the community for Wynnewood, a community outside of Philadelphia. The name became official on April 6, 1887.

History 
At the time of its founding, Wynnewood was located in Pickens County, Chickasaw Nation.

Wynnewood quickly became a market town for the surrounding area. In 1887, Presbyterian missionary Mary Semple Hotchkins moved her school for Chickasaw children from Cherokee Town to Wynnewood. In 1901, local citizens paid for building Indianola College. A promotional brochure published in 1907 called Wynnewood "the Queen City of the Famous Washita Valley." It could soon boast of having an opera house, electric lights, telephones, and the thirty-room Eskridge Hotel.

The Eskridge Hotel continued in business until 1970, when it closed for good. In 1973, the Wynnewood Historical Society bought the three-story structure and converted it into a museum of local history. Hotel rooms have been decorated to depict life in Oklahoma during the late 19th century and early 20th century. In 1978, the former hotel was added to the National Register of Historic Places (NRHP).

Geography
Wynnewood is located in southeastern Garvin County at  (34.643884, -97.164694). The Washita River, a tributary of the Red River, runs just to the west of the city.

The community is at the junction of U.S. Highway 77 and State Highway 29, which links it to Interstate 35 to the west. US 71 leads northwest  to Pauls Valley, the Garvin County seat, and south  to Davis. Highway 29 leads west  to Interstate 35 and east  to U.S. Route 177.

Demographics

As of the census of 2000, there were 2,367 people, 965 households, and 607 families residing in the city. The population density was 1,552.3 people per square mile (601.3/km). There were 1,104 housing units at an average density of 724.0/sq mi (280.4/km). The racial makeup of the city was 77.27% White, 10.73% African American, 7.77% Native American, 0.17% Asian, 0.68% from other races, and 3.38% from two or more races. Hispanic or Latino of any race were 2.83% of the population.

There were 965 households, out of which 29.4% had children under the age of 18 living with them, 44.4% were married couples living together, 15.1% had a female householder with no husband present, and 37.0% were non-families. 33.3% of all households were made up of individuals, and 18.7% had someone living alone who was 65 years of age or older. The average household size was 2.39 and the average family size was 3.05.

In the city, the population was spread out, with 26.0% under the age of 18, 8.1% from 18 to 24, 24.5% from 25 to 44, 21.2% from 45 to 64, and 20.3% who were 65 years of age or older. The median age was 39 years. For every 100 females, there were 83.3 males. For every 100 females age 18 and over, there were 74.9 males.

The median income for a household in the city was $26,149, and the median income for a family was $31,856. Males had a median income of $28,929 versus $19,375 for females. The per capita income for the city was $13,539. About 13.6% of families and 15.9% of the population were below the poverty line, including 22.8% of those under age 18 and 15.1% of those age 65 or over.

Economy
For many years, the local economy was based on agriculture. Principal crops in the early 20th century included pecans, peaches, corn, wheat, oats, alfalfa, cotton and clover. A cottonseed oil company and four cotton gins supported the cotton industry.

The local petroleum industry blossomed in Garvin County during the second decade of the 20th century. The Texas Pacific Coal and Oil Company built an oil refinery in Wynnewood during 1922–23. Kerr-McGee Company bought the refinery in 1950. By 1957, employment at the refinery was about equal to all other employment in the Wynnewood vicinity. The Gary-Williams Energy Corporation bought the facility in 1995. In 2012, noted investor Carl Icahn announced that he had bought a controlling interest in CVR industries, which owned the 70,000 barrel per day refinery (BPD) at Wynnewood and a 115,000 BPD refinery at Coffeyville, Kansas. The Wynnewood refinery was one of only five operating in Oklahoma as of 2015.

Media
The Wynnewood Gazette began publication in 1906, and has continued into the 21st century. Other early newspapers were the Wynnewood Republic and the Wynnewood Times.

Notable tornadoes
Wynnewood is considered to be a high risk for tornadoes, with an average of three such storms annually. One source says that as of August 2016, Wynnewood has had 175 tornadoes since 1950.

Additional trees were snapped along N3180 Road before the tornado intensified to EF3 strength east of that location, where a home was left with only interior walls standing and large trees were denuded and stripped of foliage. A home at the edge of the damage path had windows blown out. The tornado maintained EF3 strength and began to intensify further as it crossed N3210 Road, where several trees were debarked and ground scouring began to occur. A house near the south edge of the damage path had its roof torn off, and power poles were snapped as well. Shortly afterward, the tornado inflicted EF4 damage near the intersection of Indian Meridian Road and E1680 Road, where a well-built, anchor-bolted brick home was almost entirely flattened with a large portion of the foundation slab swept clean of debris. Trees in this area were debarked, extensive ground scouring occurred, and vehicles were thrown and mangled beyond recognition. A second brick house had its roof torn off, and multiple power poles were snapped. Further to the east, a poorly anchored frame home was swept cleanly away at high-end EF3 intensity. A nearby mobile home was also destroyed, with a vehicle parked nearby being rolled across the edge of a nearby pond and severely damaged. A few other homes in this area sustained less severe damage. The tornado weakened dramatically as it crossed N3250 Road, snapping and uprooting several trees before it dissipated near Interstate 35 to the southwest of Wynnewood at 4:27 PM. One person was killed by this tornado, and several others were injured.

Notable people
 James Allen, former NFL running back for the Chicago Bears and Houston Texans
 Joe Exotic, zookeeper and the subject of the documentary series Tiger King
 Tommy Franks, general who commanded the invasion forces of Operation Enduring Freedom in Afghanistan and Operation Iraqi Freedom in Iraq 
 Roy Milton (1907–1983), musician and bandleader
 Donna Shirley, who led the Mars Pathfinder project at the Jet Propulsion Laboratory

See also
 List of oil refineries

Notes

References

External links
 Wynnewood Public Schools

Cities in Garvin County, Oklahoma
Cities in Oklahoma
Populated places established in 1886
Tiger King